Donovan Gans (born July 7, 1971) is a former American football defensive linemen who played one season with the Birmingham Barracudas of the Canadian Football League (CFL). He first enrolled at Colorado State University before transferring to Texas A&M University–Kingsville. He was also a member of the Hamilton Tiger-Cats.

College career
Gans first played college football for the Colorado State Rams. He lettered for the Texas A&M–Kingsville Javelinas from 1993 to 1994.

Professional career
Gans played in 18 games for the Birmingham Barracudas in 1995. He was a member of the CFL's Hamilton Tiger-Cats in 1996.

References

External links
Just Sports Stats

Living people
1971 births
American football defensive linemen
Canadian football defensive linemen
African-American players of American football
African-American players of Canadian football
Colorado State Rams football players
Texas A&M–Kingsville Javelinas football players
Birmingham Barracudas players
Hamilton Tiger-Cats players
Players of American football from Texas
People from Orange, Texas
21st-century African-American sportspeople
20th-century African-American sportspeople